The canton of Le Kremlin-Bicêtre is an administrative division of the Val-de-Marne department, Île-de-France region, northern France. Its borders were modified at the French canton reorganisation which came into effect in March 2015. Its seat is in Le Kremlin-Bicêtre.

It consists of the following communes:
Gentilly
Le Kremlin-Bicêtre

References

Cantons of Val-de-Marne